CNS Drugs is a monthly peer-reviewed medical journal published by Adis International (Springer Nature) that covers drug treatment of psychiatric and neurological disorders.

Abstracting and indexing 
The journal is abstracted and indexed in:

According to the Journal Citation Reports, the journal has a 2021 impact factor of 6.497.

References

External links 
 

Pharmacology journals
English-language journals
Publications established in 1995
Springer Science+Business Media academic journals
Monthly journals
Hybrid open access journals